Kryoneri (meaning "cold water") is a suburban town of East Attica, Greece. Since the 2011 local government reform it is part of the municipality Dionysos, of which it is a municipal unit. The municipal unit has an area of 4.531 km2.

Geography

Kryoneri is situated in the hills in the northeastern part of the Athens conurbation, at about 380 m elevation. It lies in the eastern foothills of the Parnitha mountains. It is 2 km west of Agios Stefanos and 20 km northeast of Athens city centre. Motorway 1 (Athens - Lamia - Thessaloniki) and the railway from Athens to Thessaloniki pass east of the town.

Historical population
Kryoneri has historically been an Arvanite settlement.

Notes

External links
Official website 
GTP Travel Pages (Municipality) (in English and Greek)

Dionysos, Greece
Populated places in East Attica
Arvanite settlements